The 1989 MTV Video Music Awards aired live on September 6, 1989, honoring the best music videos from April 2, 1988, to June 1, 1989.  The show was hosted by Arsenio Hall at the Universal Amphitheatre in Los Angeles.

This year four new "genre" categories (Best Heavy Metal Video, Best Rap Video, Best Dance Video, and Best Post-Modern Video) were added, alongside the International Viewer's Choice awards. Also, the award for Best Concept Video was retired this year, and the eligibility cutoff date was moved two months down from April to June, making this a 14-month eligibility year.

In terms of the awards, Madonna and Paula Abdul were the night's biggest winners with four awards each, while rock group Living Colour was the second biggest winner, taking home three moonmen that night. On the other hand, Michael Jackson was the most nominated artist of 1989, receiving nine nominations for two of his videos: six for "Leave Me Alone" and three for "Smooth Criminal", but only took home one award for Best Special Effects. 

The award for Video of the Year, went to Neil Young's controversial video for "This Note's for You", making this the first time since The Cars' win in 1984 that an act takes home the main award without winning any other one. Unlike The Cars, though, Young's video did not have any other nominations that night except for Viewer's Choice, which until 1994 had exactly the same nominees as Video of the Year. The Viewer's Choice award, however, went to another video that also stirred up controversy: Madonna's "Like a Prayer."

The ceremony is notable for comedian Andrew Dice Clay's stand-up routine that included adult versions of Mother Goose nursery rhymes, leading MTV executives to ban him from ever appearing on the network again, and Def Leppard's performance of "Tear It Down" would be the last live appearance of guitarist Steve Clark before his death on Tuesday January 8, 1991.

Background
MTV announced in mid-June that Arsenio Hall would host the 1989 Video Music Awards, which would be held on September 6 at the Universal Amphitheatre. Nominees were announced at a press conference held at the Saxon-Lee Gallery in Los Angeles on July 11. The addition of four "genre" categories was meant to reflect MTV's new programming strategy, which shifted away from freeform video rotation to specific shows dedicated to certain genres. Thus, Best Dance Video reflected the videos on Club MTV, Best Heavy Metal Video reflected Headbangers Ball, Best Rap Video reflected Yo! MTV Raps, and Best Post-Modern Video reflected Post-Modern MTV. For the first time, the ceremony was broadcast via satellite on MTV's international affiliates, leading to the introduction of the International Viewer's Choice awards. The ceremony broadcast was preceded by Ken & Kevin on the Road to the 1989 MTV Video Music Awards, hosted by Ken Ober and Kevin Seal.

Performances

Presenters
 Christina Applegate and Alice Cooper – presented Best Group Video
 Mick Jagger – presented the Best Group Video Moonman to Living Colour during their acceptance segment via satellite from Three Rivers Stadium
 Corbin Bernsen and Downtown Julie Brown – presented Best Dance Video
 Richard Lewis – introduced Def Leppard
 Jasmine Guy and "Weird" Al Yankovic – presented Best Video from a Film
 Mötley Crüe – presented Best Heavy Metal Video
 Jody Watley and Lou Diamond Phillips – presented Best Choreography in a Video and Best Stage Performance in a Video
 Robert Townsend – introduced the International Viewer's Choice Award winners
 VJs Daisy Fuentes (Internacional), Sayo Morita (Japan) and Maiken Wexø (Europe) – announced Viewer's Choice winners for their respective regions
 Ray Cokes – briefly introduced international winners Chayanne and Kome Kome Club before a commercial break and told viewers what was 'coming up' on the show
 James Woods – presented Best Direction in a Video
 Ione Skye and Christian Slater – presented Best New Artist in a Video
 Madonna – presented the Video Vanguard Award
 Neneh Cherry and Fab Five Freddy – presented Best Rap Video
 Arsenio Hall (host) – introduced the winners of the professional categories and announced the winners of Breakthrough Video and Best Post-Modern Video
 Andrew Dice Clay – introduced Cher
 Ken Ober and Colin Quinn – presented Viewer's Choice
 Julie Brown and Richard Marx – presented Best Male Video and Best Female Video
 Michael Hutchence – presented Video of the Year

Winners and  nominees
Winners are listed first and highlighted in bold.

Other appearances
 Kevin Seal – appeared in a couple of pre-commercial segments telling viewers what was 'coming up' on the show
 Richard Lewis – performed a brief stand-up routine
 Fab Five Freddy – appeared in a pre-commercial segment telling viewers what was 'coming up' on the show
 Julie Brown – appeared in a series of taped vignettes before some commercial breaks
 Adam Curry – appeared in a couple of pre-commercial segments telling viewers what was 'coming up' on the show
 Daisy Fuentes – appeared in a pre-commercial segment telling viewer's what was 'coming up' on the show
 Andrew Dice Clay – performed a brief stand-up routine
 Ken Ober and Colin Quinn – appeared in segments about Viewer's Choice voting procedures throughout the show

References

1989
MTV Video Music Awards
MTV Video Music Awards
MTV Video Music Awards